John Kilkenny previously was President of Visual Effects at 20th Century Fox. His division budgeted, produced and oversaw all visual effects on feature films made by the studio's production units, 20th Century Fox, Fox 2000 Pictures and Fox Searchlight Pictures.

Most notably, Kilkenny is credited with overseeing the Academy Award-winning effects on Avatar which was written and directed by Academy Award-winning filmmaker James Cameron (Titanic) and earned a record-breaking $2.8 billion worldwide at the box office.

Kilkenny oversaw the effects on such recent blockbuster films as Prometheus, Rise of the Planet of the Apes, X-Men: First Class, Mr. Popper's Penguins and Black Swan in which Natalie Portman earned the Academy Award for Best Actress.  Kilkenny also oversaw the effects for such loved films as Night at the Museum, Night at the Museum: Battle of the Smithsonian and the Alvin and the Chipmunks franchise.  Other 20th Century Fox blockbuster films that drew success under Kilkenny's watch include X-Men: The Last Stand, Live Free or Die Hard and Fantastic Four: Rise of the Silver Surfer.

Previously, Kilkenny was an associate producer/visual effects producer on I, Robot, which earned an Academy Award nomination for best achievement in visual effects. Before that, he was a freelance visual effects producer on the films Dr. Dolittle 2, Daredevil, Gone in 60 Seconds and Star Trek: Insurrection.

Kilkenny began his career in motion picture visual effects at the renowned effects house Digital Domain, where he became head producer in the company’s commercial division. He has also worked as a freelance commercials producer (for clients Budweiser, Toyota, Chevrolet, and many others) and is even known for his work as a sportscaster at the NBC affiliate in El Paso, Texas. 

As a student at the University of Arizona, Kilkenny studied radio/television, interned at the NBC affiliate in Tucson, and was a sports producer at the local ABC station.  In addition, he headed the Association of Students concert division, booking concerts headlined by superstars like Huey Lewis and the News, Barry Manilow, Kenny Rogers, and Hall and Oats.  

The university has recognized Kilkenny for his achievements in the film industry by awarding him an honorary Doctorate of Fine Arts during the spring of 2009 graduation ceremony.

References

External links 

Arizona Alumni Magazine feature article on John Kilkenny

Year of birth missing (living people)
Living people
American film studio executives
Special effects people
University of Arizona alumni